is a disaster novel by Japanese writer Sakyo Komatsu, published in 1973. Komatsu took nine years to complete the work. It was published in two volumes, both released at the same time. The novel received the 27th Mystery Writers of Japan Award and the Seiun Award for a Japanese novel-length work. The English translation was first published in 1975. In 1995, after the Osaka-Kobe earthquake, a second English edition was published. The English translation is abridged . In 2006, a sequel to the novel, co-authored with Kōshū Tani, was published.

The novel has led to works in other media as well as a sequel: a film based on the novel made in the same year directed by Shirō Moritani, a manga adaptation written by Takao Saito and published in Weekly Shōnen Champion from 1973–74, a television drama by TBS and Toho broadcast in 1974–75, a film remake in 2006 by Shinji Higuchi, a parody created in 2011 that features reverse disaster, an original net anime series released on Netflix by Science Saru in July 2020, and a reboot drama, Japan Sinks: People of Hope, broadcast in October 2021 on TBS.

Geophysical background 

Japan is on a destructive plate boundary, where the Philippine Sea Plate subducts the Eurasian Plate. It is a triple junction and three subduction zones are involved. After the 2011 Tōhoku earthquake and tsunami, towns like Ishinomaki subsided.

Political background
This novel is now seen as an important look into the cultural context of 1970s Japan, particularly due to its level of popularity.

Anime adaptation
Principal: Japan Sinks: People of Hope

An original net animation (ONA) anime series adaptation of the novel was announced on October 9, 2019. The series, titled Japan Sinks: 2020, was animated by Science Saru, with Ho Pyeon-gang and Masaaki Yuasa served as directors. Toshio Yoshitaka handled series composition, Naoya Wada designed the characters, and Kensuke Ushio composed the series' music. Yuko Sasaki, Reina Ueda and Tomo Muranaka are credited with starring roles. It was released worldwide by Netflix on July 9, 2020. A film compilation version of the series was subsequently released in Japanese theaters on November 13, 2020.

Summary
Shortly after the 2020 Tokyo Olympics, a major earthquake hits Japan. Amidst the chaos, the Mutou siblings Ayumu (a 3rd year junior high school student and track and field athlete) and her younger brother Gou (a 5th grader and video game enthusiast) attempt to escape the city with their family and friends. However, the sinking Japanese archipelago complicates their escape. Plunged into extreme conditions, the Mutou siblings believe in the future and acquire the strength to survive with utmost effort.

Voice cast

Episode list

Reception
On review aggregator Rotten Tomatoes, the series holds a 72% approval rating based on 18 reviews, with an average rating of 6.54/10. The website's critics consensus reads, "Japan Sinks: 2020s swell of tension and frenetic pace leave little room to breathe, but bursts of hope and interesting insights into humanity may help brave viewers weather its apocalyptic story." The series attracted criticism within Japan for its condemnation of Japanese nationalism, but also received positive attention in the West for its multiculturalism and inclusiveness, and was named as one of the best anime series of 2020.

The first episode of Japan Sinks: 2020 was awarded the 2021 Annecy Jury Prize for a Television Series, and the series as a whole received two nominations at the 2021 Crunchyroll Anime Awards. The compilation film version of the series was awarded a Jury Selection Prize at the 2021 Japan Media Arts Festival.

Parodies
A parody short story by Yasutaka Tsutsui, titled Nihon Igai Zenbu Chinbotsu (The Whole World Sinks Except Japan) was also released in 1973, and adapted into a film of the same name in 2006.

References

External links
 (anime) at Netflix

 Entry in The Encyclopedia of Science Fiction

1973 novels
1973 science fiction novels
Avex Group
Japanese-language Netflix original programming
Japanese novels adapted into films
Netflix original anime
Japanese science fiction novels
Novels about disasters
Novels by Sakyo Komatsu
Novels set in Japan
Science fiction novels adapted into films
Science Saru
Works about earthquakes